This list of renewable resources produced and traded by the United Kingdom presents various renewable resources such as crops for food or fuel, livestock and wood with accompanying information being given on its production and trade by the United Kingdom.

 

(For non-renewable resources of the United Kingdom see: Coal mining in the United Kingdom, Hydraulic fracturing in the United Kingdom, Mining in the United Kingdom and North Sea oil).

Agriculture in the United Kingdom

Forestry in the United Kingdom

Aquaculture and fishing in the United Kingdom

Updated statistics from the UK's Marine Management Organisation on the UK fishing sector show that UK vessels landed 724 thousand tonnes of sea fish in 2017, with a value of £980 million. 290 thousand tonnes of this haul was landed abroad by UK vessels.

Renewable energy in the United Kingdom

In 2013 the United Kingdom had a total of electricity generated from, renewable sources of 53,667 GWh.

The demand for electricity (produced from renewable and non-renewable sources) in the United Kingdom through 2013 measured:
104,124GWh (first quarter), 86,830GWh (second quarter), 83,811GWh (third quarter), 96,457GWh (fourth quarter), 
producing a total of 371,222GWh (2013).

See also

Agriculture in the United Kingdom
Beekeeping in the United Kingdom
British timber trade
Demography of the United Kingdom
Department for Environment, Food and Rural Affairs
Environmental impact of agriculture
Environmental impact of fishing
Environmental impact of shipping
Entomophagy, Consumption of insects
Fishing industry in Scotland
Food waste in the United Kingdom
Forestry in the United Kingdom
Hunting and shooting in the United Kingdom
Renewable Transport Fuel Obligation
Victory garden

References

Agriculture in the United Kingdom
Fishing in the United Kingdom
Foreign trade of the United Kingdom
 
Renewable energy in the United Kingdom